Portal is an Australian extreme metal band whose style is an unorthodox fusion of death metal, black metal, dark ambient and experimental music. The band's hybrid musical style is characterised by heavily distorted guitar riffs, down-tuned rhythms, and vocals ranging from "menacing, echoing" sound effects to death grunts.

Writing for Popmatters, Adrien Begrand noted that "death metal always pretends to be scary, but [...] it's all rather harmless. That said, however, I make no mistake in saying that the death metal peddled by Australia's Portal is truly friggin' terrifying". Lead guitarist Horror Illogium has described Portal's intent as "to capture a cinematic horror scope". They have released seven full-length albums to date, as well as a number of EPs and split releases. Their most recent albums, Avow and Hagbulbia, were released in 2021 on Profound Lore Records.

Musical style 
Portal's main musical influences were Morbid Angel, Beherit, and Immolation. Describing the band's style, Decibel magazine said: "If Morbid Angel and Gorguts had birthed a German Expressionist child, that unholy creature would be Portal."  The band has been praised for its "hellish atmosphere" and "distant, obscure" interpretation of death metal.  Denise Falzon, writing for Exclaim!, described Portal's 2004 EP, The Sweyy, as  "extremely raw [...] with heavily distorted guitar riffs that aid in the album's overall chaotic and apocalyptic atmosphere". The band's style has also been described as oriented around "constant dissonance", "sporadic compositions", and "abstract themes". However, lead guitarist Horror Illogium has disputed the view that the band's songwriting lacks structure: "We are indeed making songs, although our structures are unusual. They are constructed with a great deal of artistic, obsessive scrutiny [...] An insane asylum is a structure; our songs can be viewed as structures housing insane elements".

Asked if Portal's exploration of extreme music could eventually move beyond the scope of death metal, Horror Illogium responded that:

While some critics have noted a "lack of production quality" and "unrefined, murky sound" on Portal's albums, Horror Illogium countered that the band spends considerable time consciously "exploring different equipment for guitar tones with enough articulation as well as dirt". Stating that "there are only so many frequencies that can share a space," he indicated that Portal's approach involved striking "a balance to allow the instruments to spill forth and explode when necessary. This will give a more detailed soundscape and accentuate the impact and depth of certain sections of music".

Anonymity of the musicians 
The band members keep their identities obscured and use stage names. Their costumes are composed of "suits and executioners' masks save for vocalist The Curator", who wears headgear fitting the theme of  the latest album, such as "a huge, tattered wizard's hat that obscures his face" in the case of Seepia.

The idea for these costumes was developed by The Curator and Horror Illogium, who were inspired by fashion of the 1920s and imagery created by actor Lon Chaney Sr. in a few of his roles from the silent film era which, according to Horror Illogium, was the ideal figure that the band wanted to portray. The band's lead guitarist, Horror Illogium remarked that "anonymity has never been the modus operandi. It is the feeling we ourselves are subjected to, they [the costumes and stage names] serve as vessels for our escape". In an interview with underground media site Deaf Sparrow, PORTAL was interviewed entirely in character with the writer addressing them based on their anonymous personas.

Lyrical themes and musical concepts 

The band cites as inspiration for its lyrical themes the entities mentioned in Lovecraft Mythos, such as Nyarlathotep, Yog-Sothoth, Azathoth, and Cthulhu.  According to a recent interview, however, their lore is deeply set in other writings.  Guitarist Horror Illogium stated that Lovecraft was barely more than a mentioning in their early days, and they have since developed their own mythos.  The Curator similarly said that Portal is "not a Lovecraftian Band. We only borrowed from the Mythos in our infancy and had reference themes on several tracks."  Portal has defined this as the Olde Guarde, their 'sect' according to the interview, who promote ideas of the Vint-Age, which is Portal' usage of references to old technology, esoteric writings, and Victorian/Edwardian culture.

Members

Current 
 The Curator – vocals (1994–present)
 Horror Illogium – lead guitar (1994–present)
 Aphotic Mote – rhythm guitar (2003–present)
 Ignis Fatuus – drums (2007–present)
 Omenous Fugue – bass (2009–present)

Former 
 Werm – bass (2002–2005)
 Mephitic – drums (2002–2005)
 Elsewhere – bass (2006)
 Monocular – drums (2006)
 Phathom Conspicuous – bass (2007–2008)
Source

Timeline

Discography

Studio albums 
 Seepia (2003)
 Outré (2007)
 Swarth (2009)
 Vexovoid (2013)
 Ion (2018)
 Avow (2021)
 Hagbulbia (2021)

Extended plays 
 The End Mills (2002)
 The Sweyy (2004)

Demos 
 Portal (1998)
 Lurker at the Threshold (2006)

References

External links 

 

Musical groups from Brisbane
Musical groups established in 1994
Australian death metal musical groups
Australian black metal musical groups
Profound Lore Records artists